Ryan Quinn (born January 29, 1978) is an American curler from Eau Claire, Wisconsin.

At the national level, he is a 2000 United States men's curling champion.

Teams

Personal life
He started curling in 1986 at the age of 8.

References

External links

1978 births
Living people
Sportspeople from Eau Claire, Wisconsin
Sportspeople from La Crosse, Wisconsin
American male curlers
American curling champions